Lindwedel is a municipality in the administrative division of Schwarmstedt, in the Heidekreis region of Lower Saxony, Germany.

There is evidence of settlement in the area for several millennia.  The first mention of Lindwedel is in the year  1304.

The municipality comprises the villages of Lindwedel and Hope.

Neighboring municipalities are Vesbeck, Oegenbostel, Plumhof, Berkhof, Sprockhof, Buchholz (Aller), Grindau and Esperke.

References

Heidekreis